Nicole Fessel (born 19 May 1983) is a German former cross-country skier who competed between 2000 and 2018. Her best World Cup finish was second twice (team sprint: 2009, 4 × 5 km relay: March 2010). Fessel's best individual finish was second in Switzerland in 2014.

Competing in two Winter Olympics, her best finish was 17th in the individual sprint event at Vancouver in 2010 Fessel's best finish at the FIS Nordic World Ski Championships was 15th twice, both in the sprint events (2007, 2009).

She announced her retirement from cross-country skiing in September 2019.

Cross-country skiing results
All results are sourced from the International Ski Federation (FIS).

Olympic Games
 1 medal – (1 bronze)

World Championships

World Cup

Season standings

Individual podiums
3 podiums – (3 )

Team podiums
 2 podiums – (1 , 1 )

References

External links

 
 
 
 

1983 births
Living people
People from Südliche Weinstraße
Cross-country skiers at the 2006 Winter Olympics
Cross-country skiers at the 2010 Winter Olympics
Cross-country skiers at the 2014 Winter Olympics
Cross-country skiers at the 2018 Winter Olympics
German female cross-country skiers
Tour de Ski skiers
Olympic cross-country skiers of Germany
Medalists at the 2014 Winter Olympics
Olympic medalists in cross-country skiing
Olympic bronze medalists for Germany
Sportspeople from Rhineland-Palatinate